Darcy Lynn LaPier (born July 9, 1965) is an American former actress and model.

Early life 
LaPier graduated from Portland State University. She also studied drama at the University of Oregon and Huntington Film Institute in Florida.

Personal life 
She was first married, at the age of 19, to Larry Ray Robertson (from 1984 to 1993), but, whilst participating in a Hawaiian Tropic Beauty Pageant in 1985, she caught the eye of Ron Rice, Hawaiian Tropic's founder. After one date, they quickly became inseparable and were married in 1991. This union produced a daughter, Sterling. Whilst still married to Ron Rice, she met and fell in love with Actor Jean-Claude Van Damme, who was married to bodybuilder Gladys Portugues at the time. After learning of Darcy's affair with Van Damme, Rice began divorce proceedings, but upon learning that at the time of their marriage she was not yet divorced from her first husband, he had the marriage annulled. (As a consequence, LaPier was entitled to child support, but not alimony, from Ron Rice.)  She then married a now-divorced Van Damme in Bangkok, Thailand in February 1994; their marriage lasted until November 1997. This marriage produced a son, Nicholas van Varenberg (born October 10, 1995). Van Damme later went on to remarry Gladys Portugues.

On Valentine's Day 1999, LaPier married Mark R. Hughes, founder of Herbalife, at Beverly Hills Presbyterian Church. The wedding was attended by many of Herbalife's top distributors, and was broadcast on HBN (Herbalife Broadcast Network) to distributors worldwide.  Hughes died in his sleep on May 21 the following year. In the days following his death, LaPier had the grounds of their Malibu estate covered in 14,000 red roses.
 
After Hughes' death, LaPier moved back to Oregon. She married Brian Snodgrass (of the Seven Dees nursery family) in 2002, and had a daughter, Madison Snodgrass. On her ranch in Oregon with her family, LaPier transformed herself into a rodeo barrel racer. In 2013, she produced and starred in A&E's reality series Rodeo Girls.

Filmography

References

External links 
 

1965 births
Actresses from Oregon
Living people
American film actresses
Female models from Oregon
Portland State University alumni
University of Oregon alumni
21st-century American women